The Indian March of Paul was a secret project of a planned allied Russo-French expedition against the British Company rule in India. It was scuttled following the assassination of Emperor Paul I of Russia in March 1801.

Russia and Britain were allied during the French Revolutionary Wars of the 1790s. The simultaneous failure of their 1799 joint invasion of the Netherlands, as well as the 1799 Austro-Russian Italian and Swiss expedition which Britain partially financed, precipitated a change in attitudes. Britain's occupation of Malta in October 1800 incensed Emperor Paul in his capacity of Grand Master of the Knights Hospitaller. He hastily broke with Britain and allied himself with Napoleon who came up with an extravagant plan of a Russo-French expedition to attack the British possessions in India.

Secret plans 

The secret plan of the expedition, as preserved in the Russian archives, envisaged the joint operations of two infantry corps, one French (with artillery support) and one Russian. Each infantry corps had 35,000 men, the total force thus containing 70,000 men, plus artillery and a large contingent of Cossack cavalry.

Napoleon insisted that the command of the French corps be entrusted to General André Masséna. The route of advance schedule for the French corps started in May 1801 via the Danube and the Black Sea through southern Russia via Taganrog, Tsaritsyn, and Astrakhan.

At the Volga estuary, the French  were supposed to be joined by Russian forces. Then the joint Russo-French corps was to cross the Caspian Sea and land at the Iranian port of Astrabad. The whole trip from France to Astrabad was calculated to take eighty days. Further advance would take another fifty days via Herat and Kandahar before reaching the main areas of India in September of the same year.

The Indian March was designed to look very much like Napoleon's expedition to Egypt, with engineers, painters and scientists taking part. Also meticulously devised was the public relations side of the Indian expedition. For example, the instructions for trade with the local peoples included the recommendation to sell the cloths "of the colorings most liked by the Asians". The expeditionary force was to have in stock a reserve of fireworks for festive illuminations.

Outcome 

In January 1801, the Don Cossack ataman Vasily Petrovich Orlov received orders for his cavalry force to march toward India. The route of advance schedule was to reach the steppe fort of Orenburg in a month, and from there to move via Bukhara and Khiva to the Indus River. Soon after receiving these orders, the 20,000-strong Cossack force started for the Kazakh steppes.

In his book about the Great Game, Peter Hopkirk narrates that Paul had not been able to obtain a detailed map of India until the Cossacks' departure from Orenburg. He quotes the Tsar as instructing Orlov: "My maps only go as far as Khiva and the River Oxus. Beyond these points it is your affair to gain information about the possessions of the English, and the condition of the native population subject to their rule".

When Orlov's modest Cossack contingent advanced as far south as the Aral Sea, they received intelligence of the Emperor's assassination. The Indian March was brought to a halt, and before long the Cossacks were commanded to retreat. It is tempting to speculate that the Pahlen plot was triggered by the Indian adventure, given that the high-placed Russian officials did not approve of it and their conspiracy was financed by British diplomacy. There is no evidence to confirm this conjecture.

Assessment 

The British public learned about the incident years later, but it firmly imprinted on the popular consciousness, contributing to feelings of mutual suspicion and distrust associated with the Great Game. Hugh Seton-Watson observes that "the grotesque plan had no military significance, but at least showed its author's state of mind". This assessment is echoed by Hopkirk who remarks that "no serious thought or study has been given to this wild adventure".

See also 
Duhamel plan (1854)
Khrulev plan (1855)

References

Literature 
 

1801 in British India
1801 in France
1801 in military history
1801 in the Russian Empire
Campaigns of the Napoleonic Wars
Cancelled invasions
Cancelled military operations involving France
Cancelled military operations involving the Russian Empire
France–Russia military relations
Invasions by France
Invasions by Russia
Invasions of India
Military history of British India
Wars involving the Russian Empire
Paul I of Russia